Rousseau on Women, Love, and Family is an anthology of works by French philosopher Jean-Jacques Rousseau covering five themes: women and politics, gender identity, women, love, and family. The volume was edited by Christopher Kelly and Eve Grace. It includes four passages from Rousseau's Emile, and excerpts from his Letter to d'Alembert, Levite of Ephraim and Émile et Sophie. Two of the letters to "Henriette" were translated for the first time by the editors for inclusion in this volume.

References

French philosophy
Gender studies books
Women's studies